MBM is shortened from MultiBitMap which, as the name suggests, is a container for a set of bitmap images. The contained bitmaps are not stored verbatim. Rather, each one is stored with a modified bitmap header with no data compression or with 8-, 12-, 16-, or 24-bit RLE compression.

MBM files are used by lots of Symbian GUI applications to store their graphical content.

See also
 Symbian OS
 Symbian Ltd.
 Symbian installation source

References

Graphics file formats